Kathmandu Engineering College,  KEC is a Tribhuvan University (TU) affiliated, Private College located at Kalimati, Kathmandu. The college was established in 1998 A.D.

KEC provides a choice of Bachelor degree courses with a focus on both practical and theoretical engineering studies: Architecture, Civil Engineering, Computer Engineering, Electrical Engineering, Electronics and Communication Engineering.

Departments

There are 7 departments:
Department of Civil engineering
Department of Computer Engineering
Department of Architecture
Department of Electrical Engineering
Department of Electronics, Communication & Information Engineering
Department of Mechanical Engineering
 of Science and Humanities

Association and Clubs

Organizations On-Campus includes:
 KEC Electrical Club 
 KEC IT CLUB (ITC)
 Robotics Club
 Electronics Project Club (EPC)
 CESS-KEC (Civil Engineering Students' Society KEC)
 Association of KEC AKAR (Association of KEC Architecture)
 Microsoft Student Partner with KEC
 Free Students’ Council (FSC)
 H-Help KEC
 KEC Alumni Association
 Internally Enthusiastic Student’s Association (IESA)
 Free Students’ Council (FSC)

References

Buildings and structures in Kathmandu
Engineering universities and colleges in Nepal
Tribhuvan University
1998 establishments in Nepal